P. Ramaswamy Natarajan (born 21 December 1950) is a member of the 17th Lok Sabha of India. He represents the Coimbatore constituency of Tamil Nadu and is a member of the CPI(M). He is the parliamentary group leader of CPIM in Loksabha.

Personal life
P.R. Natarajan was born to P. V. Ramaswamy Iyer and Mangalambal at Coimbatore on 21 December 1950. He has completed his undergraduate education from Madras University. P. R. Natarajan is married to R. Vanaja. They got married on 5 April 1981.

Political career
He was elected to Lok Sabha from Coimbatore Lok Sabha Constituency, Tamil Nadu in the 2019 Lok Sabha elections after defeating C P Radhakrishnan of BJP by over 1.79 Lakh votes. P. R. Natarajan has secured about 571,150 votes in this election. P. R. Natarajan from Coimbatore along with Su. Venkatesan from Madurai are the two Communist Party of India (Marxist) MPs from Tamil Nadu. P.R. Natarajan was also a member of the 15th Lok Sabha, when he defeated R. Prabhu of Indian National Congress in 2009, with a margin of over 35000 votes.

References

External links
 Official biographical sketch in Parliament of India website

1950 births
Living people
India MPs 2009–2014
People from Coimbatore
Lok Sabha members from Tamil Nadu
Communist Party of India (Marxist) candidates in the 2014 Indian general election
Communist Party of India (Marxist) politicians from Tamil Nadu
Politicians from Coimbatore
India MPs 2019–present